Codex Regis (Minuscule 88 in the Gregory-Aland numbering) (α 200 in von Soden's numbering), is a Greek minuscule manuscript of the New Testament, on parchment leaves. Palaeographically it has been assigned to the 12th-century. It has marginalia.

Formerly it was labelled by 83a, 93p, and 99r.

Description 

The codex contains the text of the Acts of the Apostles, Catholic epistles, Pauline epistles (He, 1 Tim), and the Book of Revelation, on 123 parchment leaves (size ), with some lacunae. The text is written in two columns per page, 37 lines per page.

It was assigned the number 88 by Caspar René Gregory.

The section 1 Corinthians 14:34-35 is placed after 1 Corinthians 14:40, which is its location in manuscripts of the Western text-type (Claromontanus, Augiensis, Boernerianus, itar,e), and one manuscript of the Vulgate (Codex Reginensis).

Text 

The Greek text of the codex Aland placed in Category III.
According to F. H. A. Scrivener it is close textually to 63, 72, 80.

It contains, in the margin, the text of Acts 8:37.

In Acts 27:39 it reads εκσωσαι for εξοσαι along with B*, C, copsa, bo, arm.

In Romans 8:1 it reads Ιησου κατα σαρκα περιπατουσιν αλλα κατα πνευμα, for Ιησου. The reading of the manuscript is supported by third corrector of Sinaiticus (אc), Dc, K, P, 33, 104, 181, 326, 330, (436 omit μη), 456, 614, 630, 1241, 1877, 1962, 1984, 1985, 2492, 2495, Byz, Lect.

In 1 Corinthians 2:1 it reads μυστηριον along with 𝔓46, א, Α, C, 436, ita,r, syrp, copbo. Other manuscripts read μαρτυριον or σωτηριον.

In 1 Timothy 3:16 it reads ο θεος for ος.

In 1 John 5:6 it has textual variant δι' ὕδατος καὶ πνεύματος καὶ αἵματος (through water and spirit and blood) together with the manuscripts: Codex Porphyrianus, 81, 442, 630, 915, 2492, arm, eth. Bart D. Ehrman identified it as Orthodox corrupt reading. It contains the Comma Johanneum added by a later hand on the margin.

History 

The manuscript was written by Evagrius and compared with Pamphilus copy at Caesarea. It was examined by Joachim Camerarius (in 1574), Birch, Scholz, Dean Burgon, Ernst von Dobschütz. C. R. Gregory saw it in 1886.

Formerly it was labelled by 83a, 93p, and 99r. In 1908 Gregory gave the number 88 to it.

It is currently housed in at the Biblioteca Nazionale Vittorio Emanuele III (Ms. II. A.7), at Naples.

See also 

 List of New Testament minuscules
 Biblical manuscript
 Textual criticism

Notes

References

Further reading 

 Ernst von Dobschütz, "A hitherto unpublished Prologue to the Acts of the Apostles", AJT 2 (Baltimore, 1898), pp. 353–387. 
 H. S. Murphy, "On the Text of Codices H and 93", JBL 78 (Philadelphia, 1959), pp. 228–237.

External links 
 Philip B. Payne, MS. 88 as Evidence for a Text without 1 Cor 14.34-5, New Testament Studies, vol 44 (1998), pp. 152–158.

Greek New Testament minuscules
12th-century biblical manuscripts